The Crepulje mine is one of the largest lead and zinc mines in Kosovo. The mine is located in Leposavić. The mine has reserves amounting to 14 million tonnes of ore grading 2.17% lead and 20.07% zinc thus resulting 303,800 tonnes of lead and 2,810,000 tonnes of zinc.

References

External links
Official website

Lead and zinc mines in Kosovo
North Kosovo
Leposavić